is a railway station operated by West Japan Railway Company (JR West) in Yamaguchi, Yamaguchi, and is a stopping point for the Sanyō Shinkansen and the Sanyō Main Line, and serves as termini of Yamaguchi Line and Ube Line. It is also the starting station of the rapid sightseeing train SL Yamaguchi steam train on the Yamaguchi Line.

Layout
The station has nine regular tracks (for the Sanyō Main Line, the Yamaguchi Line and the Ube Line) and two Shinkansen tracks. Three local tracks are located on the north side of the station, and the Shinkansen tracks are elevated and located on the south side of the station.
Each of the platforms is connected by an overpass at end of the station.

Platforms

Adjacent stations

Some Nozomi, Mizuho, Hikari, and Sakura Shinkansen services pass through this station without stopping.

History
 December 3, 1900: Sanyō Railway opens Ogōri Station
 December 1, 1906: Station is transferred to Japanese Government Railways as a part of railway nationalization
 February 21, 1909: Dainippon Kido Yamaguchi Branch Office Line begins operation
  February 20, 1913: Yamaguchi Line between Yamaguchi Station begins operation, Dainippon Kido Line closes
 March 26, 1925: Ube Tetsudō Line to Ajisu Station begins operation
 May 1, 1943: Ube Tetsudō Line transferred to Japanese Government Railways Ube Line
 September, 1961: Present station building (North Entrance) begins to be used
 March 10, 1975: The Sanyō Shinkansen stops here for the first time
 April 1, 1987: Station operation is taken over by JR West after privatization of Japanese National Railways
 October 1, 2003: Ogōri Station changes its name to Shin-Yamaguchi Station

See also
 List of railway stations in Japan

External links
 JR West station information 

Railway stations in Japan opened in 1900
Sanyō Main Line
Sanyō Shinkansen
Railway stations in Yamaguchi Prefecture
Stations of West Japan Railway Company